List of titles used by the followers of Ismailism, a branch of Shia Islam.

The titles are of Persian and Arabic origin.

Nizari Ismaili titles
The hierarchy (hudūd) of the organization of the Nizari Ismailis of the Alamut period was as follows:
Imām, the descendants of Nizar
Dā'ī ad-Du'āt ( literally "Da'i of the Da'is"), "Chief Da'i"
Dā'ī kabīr – "Superior Da'i", "Great Da'i"
Dā'ī (literally "missionary") – "Ordinary Da'i", "Da'i"
Rafīq (literally "companion, assistance, fellow-traveler"), plural rafīqān
Lāṣiq (literally "adherent"). Lasiqs had to swear a special oath of obedience to the Imam.
Fidā'ī (literally "self-sacrificer")

Imam and da'is were the elites, while the majority of the sect consisted of the last three grades who were peasants and artisans.

Other titles include:

The titles Bābā (Persian equivalent of the Arabic Shaykh, "Old Man") and Sayyidinā (Sayyidnā) (literally "Our Lord" or "Our Master") was used by the Nizaris to refer to Hassan-i Sabbah.

Kiyā – a ruler or commander. Notably held by Buzurg-Ummid.
Muhtasham – a governor of Quhistan.
Mahdī - the rightly guided one
Qāim - the one who rises
Nāṭiq (ناطق) - the messenger-prophet
Waṣī (وصي) - the prophet's "legatee"
Bāb - literally "gate"
Hujjah - literally "proof"
Dā'ī al-Balagh - regional missionary
Dā'ī al-Mutlaq - absolute missionary
Mādhun - assistant
Mukāsir - debater
Shaykh - elder in Arabic
Pīr - senior elder in Persian
Mukhi - headman
Kāmādia - treasurer
Vāras/Vizier - minister
Aāmilsaheb - agent
Shāhzāda - prince
Allāma - scholar
Mu'allim - teacher
Mullāh - lesser elder in Persian
President - national leadership title
Amīr - commander
Amīr al-mu'minīn - commander of the faithful
Begum - noble lady
Māta Salāmat - Mother of Peace
Sayyid - descendant
Hakīm - doctor
Khwājah - master
Mawlānā - our master
Murshid - guide-master
Wali - guardian
Qādī - judge
Murīd - follower
Mustajib - respondent
Hājī - pilgrim
Khalif - deputy
Sitt - noble lady

Other titles
Aga Khan

References

Medieval titles
Tiles